Sa Re Ga Ma Pa Seniors 2019 is a 2019 Indian-Tamil language reality singing television show, which aired on Zee Tamil from 18 May 2019 to 10 August 2019 on every Saturday and Sunday at 7:00PM (IST). Persons above the age of 18 years were permitted to audition to showcase their talent on the platform. It is the second season of Sa Re Ga Ma Pa Seniors. The three main judges of this show are playback singer and music composer Vijay Prakash, evergreen playback singers Srinivas and Sujatha. It is hosted by anchor Archana. The winner of the season was Aslam.

Synopsis
There are 24 contestants in this competition. Several rounds will be happened to shortlist best contestants for the finale. Marks will be given to contestants on the basis of their performance, which is judged by three main judges and 50 members of the grand jury panel.

Out of 100 marks, 60 percent of weightage would be given to the jury member’s vote and 40 percent to the judges. The contestants who gets 100% mark will get the golden performance tag. The contestants who secured least mark will enter the danger zone and they will be either saved or eliminated on the basis of their marks.

Episodes

Results

 The contestant who received the golden performance tag
 The contestant who saved from danger zone
 The contestant who got eliminated

Semi-final
Top 8 contestants sung as pairs in the one-one round, which is the last round before semi-final. Malgudi Subha joined as a special judge with Srinivas and Sujatha. They  wrote the names of contestants in golden tickets individually and put them into a box. In the semi-final round, Yuvan Shankar Raja joined as a  special judge with Srinivas, Sujatha, and Vijay Prakash and the golden ticket method continued to select finalists. At the end of the semi-final round, the top 5 contestants get qualified into final based on the number of golden tickets won by them. As the 5th place ends up in a tie, Karthik get qualified into final based on popular votes.

 The contestant who gets qualified into final
 The contestant who got eliminated

Final

References

External links
 Sa Re Ga Ma Pa Seniors 2 at ZEE5

Zee Tamil original programming
Tamil-language singing talent shows
Tamil-language reality television series
2019 Tamil-language television series debuts
Tamil-language television shows
2019 Tamil-language television seasons
Television shows set in Tamil Nadu
2019 Tamil-language television series endings